Niku Kruger (born 9 October 1991) is a former South African-born American rugby union player who played scrum-half for the Denver Stampede. Kruger has also played for the Glendale Raptors. He played college rugby with Kutztown University, reaching the finals of the Collegiate Rugby Championship.

Kruger has also played for the United States national rugby union team. Kruger debuted for the United States in 2015, and was part of the U.S. squad at the 2015 Rugby World Cup.

References

External links

World Cup Profile

Living people
United States international rugby union players
1991 births
American rugby union players
Denver Stampede players
Rugby union scrum-halves